Prien is an unincorporated community and census-designated place (CDP) in Calcasieu Parish, Louisiana, United States. The population was 7,810 at the 2010 census. It is part of the Lake Charles metropolitan statistical area. Some of the area has been annexed into the city of Lake Charles.

Geography
Prien is located at  (30.171700, -93.267384) and consists of unincorporated land on the south side of Lake Charles. The original community of Prien is located on the southeast shore of Prien Lake, a widening in the Calcasieu River, but the CDP now extends south as far as West Gauthier Road.

The area of the CDP has decreased by  since the 2000 census, due to annexation of certain neighborhoods by the city of Lake Charles.

Demographics

As of the 2020 United States census, there were 7,745 people, 2,999 households, and 2,284 families residing in the CDP.

References

Census-designated places in Louisiana
Census-designated places in Calcasieu Parish, Louisiana
Census-designated places in Lake Charles metropolitan area